The 1908 season in Swedish football, starting January 1908 and ending December 1908:

Honours

Official titles

Competitions

Promotions, relegations and qualifications

Promotions

Relegations

Domestic results

Stockholmsserien klass 1 1908 

Title-deciding match

Stockholmsserien klass 2 1908

Göteborgsserien klass I 1908–09

Göteborgsserien klass II 1908–09

Svenska Mästerskapet 1908 
Final

Corinthian Bowl 1908 
Final

Kamratmästerskapen 1908 
Final

Wicanderska Välgörenhetsskölden 1908 
Final

National team results 

 Sweden: 

 Sweden: 

 Sweden: 

 Sweden: 

 Sweden: 

 Sweden:

National team players in season 1908

Notes

References 
Print

Online

 
Seasons in Swedish football